Kriwaczek is a surname. Notable people with the surname include:

Paul Kriwaczek (1937–2011), British historian and television producer
Rohan Kriwaczek, British writer, composer, and violinist